Owen Tudor Hedges House, also known as Fairstone and Cedar Grove, is a historic home near Hedgesville, Berkeley County, West Virginia. It was built in 1860 and is a two-story, five-bay, brick Greek Revival style dwelling with a gable roof. It features a one-story, full-width porch along the front facade, with a hipped roof. Also on the property is a barn (1859), ice house (c. 1870), slave house (c. 1860), outbuilding (c. 1870), two sheds (c. 1870), and a well house / gazebo (c. 1870).

It was listed on the National Register of Historic Places in 1994.

References

Houses on the National Register of Historic Places in West Virginia
Farms on the National Register of Historic Places in West Virginia
Greek Revival houses in West Virginia
Houses completed in 1860
Houses in Berkeley County, West Virginia
National Register of Historic Places in Berkeley County, West Virginia